Torsten Tranum (born July 24, 1979) is a Danish sprint canoeist who competed in the late 1990s and the early 2000s. He won a bronze medal in the K-1 1000 m event at the 1999 ICF Canoe Sprint World Championships in Milan.

At the 2000 Summer Olympics in Sydney, he finished sixth in the K-1 1000 m event.

References

Sports-reference.com profile

1979 births
Canoeists at the 2000 Summer Olympics
Danish male canoeists
Living people
Olympic canoeists of Denmark
ICF Canoe Sprint World Championships medalists in kayak